Grabarczyk is a Polish surname, and may refer to:

 Andrzej Grabarczyk (born 1953), Polish actor
 Andrzej Grabarczyk (born 1964), Polish athlete
 Cezary Grabarczyk (born 1960), Polish politician
 Mirosław Grabarczyk (born 1971), Polish chess master
 Piotr Grabarczyk (born 1982), Polish handball player

Polish-language surnames